Mohsin Mulla (born 7 November 1981) is an Indian-born Canadian cricketer. He made his ODI debut in a game against the Netherlands at Toronto in July 2007 and is the second member of his family to play for Canada, his brother Asif Mulla being the other.

References
Deepak Sing chooo..
Cricinfo - Player profile

1981 births
Living people
Canadian cricketers
Canada One Day International cricketers
Indian emigrants to Canada
Indian cricketers
People from Navsari district